Chloractis is a genus of moths in the family Geometridae.

Species
 Chloractis pulcherrima (Butler, 1881)

References
 Chloractis at Markku Savela's Lepidoptera and Some Other Life Forms
 Natural History Museum Lepidoptera genus database

Geometrinae